maslansky + partners is a communications consultancy in New York, NY that focuses on the use of language. Their work has been used by non-profits within the disabilities community, the Republican Party (United States), nonpartisan organizations, and corporations.

Firm CEO, Michael Maslansky, and firm President, Lee Carter, are frequent commentators on Forbes, CNN, FOX News, Current TV, Entrepreneur, and others.

History 
m+p was founded by Frank Luntz and Michael Maslansky (author of the Language of Trust) in 1992, after both served as pollsters for the Ross Perot presidential campaign. In 1994, the firm worked with house minority leader Newt Gingrich to develop a messaging platform known as the Contract with America. In 2005, the firm was acquired by the Omnicom Group and has maintained a focus on nonpartisan messaging work with nonprofits and industries from pharma, to finance, to utilities, and others.

References

Sources 
 https://www.forbes.com/sites/krystledavis/2011/06/08/what-to-say-to-skeptics-using-the-language-of-trust/#1560feab29aa
 https://www.wsj.com/articles/an-alternative-investment-by-any-other-name-is-still-1439172115
 https://www.entrepreneur.com/author/michael-maslansky-and-lee-carter
 http://www.crains.com/if-i-knew-then/michael-maslansky/maslansky-partners
 https://ideamensch.com/michael-maslansky/

Marketing companies of the United States